As of March 2022, there have been 1,631 tropical cyclones of at least tropical storm intensity, and 935 of hurricane intensity within the Atlantic Ocean since 1851, the first Atlantic hurricane season to be included in the official Atlantic tropical cyclone record. Though a majority of these cyclones have fallen within climatological averages, prevailing atmospheric conditions occasionally lead to anomalous tropical systems which at times reach extremes in statistical record-keeping including in duration and intensity. The scope of this list is limited to tropical cyclone records solely within the Atlantic Ocean and is subdivided by their reason for notability.

Tropical cyclogenesis

Most activeleast active Atlantic hurricane seasons
Most Atlantic hurricane seasons prior to the weather satellite era include seven or fewer recorded tropical storms or hurricanes. As the usage of satellite data was not available until the mid-1960s, early storm counts are less reliable. Before the advent of the airplane or means of tracking storms, the ones recorded were storms that affected mainly populated areas. An undercount bias of zero to six tropical cyclones per year between 1851 and 1885 and zero to four per year between 1886 and 1910 has been estimated.

With the advent of the satellite came better and more accurate weather tracking. The first satellites sent into space to monitor the weather were known as Television Infrared Observation Satellites (TIROS). In 1961, Hurricane Esther was the first hurricane to be "discovered" through satellite readings. Although this modern invention was now available, the systems were initially not fully active enough to provide daily images of the storms. Data for the North Atlantic region remained sparse as late as 1964 due to a lack of complete satellite coverage.

The most active Atlantic hurricane season on record in terms of total storms took place in 2020, with 30 documented. The storm count for the 2020 season also includes fourteen hurricanes, of which seven strengthened to major hurricane status. On the converse, the least active season on record in terms of total storms took place in 1914. The 1914 season had just one tropical storm and no hurricanes.

Earliestlatest formations for each category

Climatologically speaking, approximately 97 percent of tropical cyclones that form in the North Atlantic develop between the dates of June 1 and November 30 – dates which delimit the modern-day Atlantic hurricane season. Though the beginning of the annual hurricane season has historically remained the same, the official end of the hurricane season has shifted from its initial date of October 31. Regardless, on average once every few years a tropical cyclone develops outside the limits of the season; as of May 2021 there have been 90 tropical cyclones in the off-season, with the most recent being Tropical Storm Ana in 2021. The first tropical cyclone of the 1938 Atlantic hurricane season, which formed on January 3, became the earliest forming tropical storm and hurricane after reanalysis concluded on the storm in December 2012. Hurricane Able in 1951 was initially thought to be the earliest forming major hurricane; however, following post-storm analysis, it was determined that Able only reached Category 1 strength, which made Hurricane Alma of 1966 the new record holder, as it became a major hurricane on June 8. Though it developed within the bounds of the Atlantic hurricane season, Hurricane Audrey in 1957 was the earliest developing Category 4 hurricane on record after it reached the intensity on June 27. However, reanalysis of 1956 to 1960 by NOAA downgraded Audrey to a Category 3, making Hurricane Dennis of 2005 the earliest Category 4 on record on July 8, 2005. The earliest-forming Category 5 hurricane, Emily, reached the highest intensity on the Saffir–Simpson hurricane wind scale on July 17, 2005.

Though the official end of the Atlantic hurricane season occurs on November 30, the dates of October 31 and November 15 have also historically marked the official end date for the hurricane season. December, the only month of the year after the hurricane season, has featured the cyclogenesis of fourteen tropical cyclones. The second Hurricane Alice in 1954 was the latest forming tropical storm and hurricane, reaching these intensities on December 30 and 31, respectively. Hurricane Alice and Tropical Storm Zeta were the only two storms to exist in two calendar years – the former from 1954 to 1955 and the latter from 2005 to 2006. No storms have been recorded to exceed Category 1 hurricane intensity in December. In 1999, Hurricane Lenny reached Category 4 intensity on November 17 as it took an unusual west to east track across the Caribbean; its intensity made it the latest developing Category 4 hurricane, though this was well within the bounds of the hurricane season. Based on reanalysis, the devastating "Cuba" hurricane in 1932 reached Category 5 intensity on November 5, making it the latest in any Atlantic hurricane season to reach this intensity.

Most tropicalsubtropical storms formed in each month
The Atlantic hurricane season presently runs from June 1 through November 30 each year, with peak activity occurring between August and October. Specifically, the height of the season is in early to mid-September. Tropical systems that form outside of these months are referred to as "off season", and account for roughly 3% of all storms that form in a given year. All of the records included below are for the most storms that formed in a given month, as the threshold for "fewest" is zero for expected months. Cases where "fewest storms" are unusual include the months when the hurricane season is at its peak.

Earliest formation records by storm number

Intensity

Most intense

Generally speaking, the intensity of a tropical cyclone is determined by either the storm's maximum sustained winds or lowest barometric pressure. The following table lists the most intense Atlantic hurricanes in terms of their lowest barometric pressure. For many years, it was thought that Hurricane Camille also attained this intensity, but this conclusion was changed in 2014. The original measurements of Camille are suspect since wind speed instrumentation used at the time would likely be damaged by winds of such intensity. Nonetheless, their central pressures are low enough to rank them among the strongest recorded Atlantic hurricanes.

Owing to their intensity, the strongest Atlantic hurricanes have all attained Category 5 classification. Hurricane Opal, the most intense Category 4 hurricane recorded, intensified to reach a minimum pressure of 916 mbar (hPa; 27.05 inHg), a pressure typical of Category 5 hurricanes. Nonetheless, the pressure remains too high to list Opal as one of the ten strongest Atlantic tropical cyclones. Currently, Hurricane Wilma is the strongest Atlantic hurricane ever recorded, after reaching an intensity of 882 mbar (hPa; 26.05 inHg) in October 2005; at the time, this also made Wilma the strongest tropical cyclone worldwide outside of the West Pacific, where seven tropical cyclones have been recorded to intensify to lower pressures. However, this was later superseded by Hurricane Patricia in 2015 in the east Pacific, which had a pressure reading of 872 mbar. Preceding Wilma is Hurricane Gilbert, which had also held the record for most intense Atlantic hurricane for 17 years. The 1935 Labor Day hurricane, with a pressure of 892 mbar (hPa; 26.34 inHg), is the third strongest Atlantic hurricane and the strongest documented tropical cyclone prior to 1950. Since the measurements taken during Wilma and Gilbert were documented using dropsonde, this pressure remains the lowest measured over land.

Hurricane Rita is the fourth strongest Atlantic hurricane in terms of barometric pressure and one of three tropical cyclones from 2005 on the list, with the others being Wilma and Katrina at first and seventh, respectively. However, with a barometric pressure of 895 mbar (hPa; 26.43 inHg), Rita is the strongest tropical cyclone ever recorded in the Gulf of Mexico. In between Rita and Katrina is Hurricane Allen. Allen's pressure was measured at 899 mbar. Hurricane Camille is the sixth strongest hurricane on record. Camille is the only storm to have been moved down the list due to post-storm analysis. Camille was originally recognized as the fifth strongest hurricane on record, but was dropped to the seventh strongest in 2014, with an estimated pressure at 905 mbars, tying it with Hurricanes Mitch, and Dean. Camille then was recategorized with a new pressure of 900 mbars. Currently, Mitch and Dean share intensities for the eighth strongest Atlantic hurricane at 905 mbar (hPa; 26.73 inHg). Hurricane Maria is in tenth place for most intense Atlantic tropical cyclone, with a pressure as low as 908 mbar (hPa; 26.81 inHg). In addition, the most intense Atlantic hurricane outside of the Caribbean Sea and Gulf of Mexico is Hurricane Dorian of 2019, with a pressure of 910 mbar (hPa; 26.9 inHg).

Many of the strongest recorded tropical cyclones weakened prior to their eventual landfall or demise. However, four of the storms remained intense enough at landfall to be considered some of the strongest landfalling hurricanes – four of the ten hurricanes on the list constitute four of the top ten most intense Atlantic landfalls in recorded history. The 1935 Labor Day hurricane made landfall at peak intensity, the most intense Atlantic hurricane landfall. Hurricane Camille made landfall in Waveland, Mississippi with a pressure of 900 mbar (hPa; 26.58 inHg), making it the second most intense Atlantic hurricane landfall. Though it weakened slightly before its eventual landfall on the Yucatán Peninsula, Hurricane Gilbert maintained a pressure of 900 mbar (hPa; 26.58 inHg) at landfall, making its landfall the second strongest, tied with Camille. Similarly, Hurricane Dean made landfall on the peninsula, though it did so at peak intensity and with a higher barometric pressure; its landfall marked the fourth strongest in Atlantic hurricane history. 

Note: Dropsondes have only been GPS-based for use in eyewalls since 1997, and the quantity of aircraft reconnaissance and surface observation stations has changed over time, such that values from storms in different periods may not be 100% consistent.

Most intense by minimum barometric pressure

Strongest by 1-minute sustained wind speed

Most intense by month
Intensity is measured solely by central pressure.

Hurricane Severity Index

Chicago Mercantile Exchange Hurricane Index

Fastest intensification
 Fastest intensification from a tropical depression to a hurricane (1-minute sustained surface winds) – 12 hoursHarvey 1981 – 35 mph (55 km/h) to 80 mph (130 km/h) – from 1200 UTC September 12 to 0000 UTC September 13
 Fastest intensification from a tropical depression to a Category 5 hurricane (1-minute sustained surface winds) – 54 hoursWilma 2005 – 35 mph (55 km/h) to 175 mph (280 km/h) – from 0000 UTC October 17 to 0600 UTC October 19Felix 2007 – 35 mph (55 km/h) to 175 mph (280 km/h) – from 1800 UTC August 31 to 0000 UTC September 3
 Fastest intensification from a tropical storm to a Category 5 hurricane (1-minute sustained surface winds) – 24 hoursWilma 2005 – 70 mph (110 km/h) to 175 mph (275 km/h) – from 0600 UTC October 18 to 0600 UTC October 19
 Maximum pressure drop in 12 hours – 83 mbarWilma 2005 –  to  – from 1800 UTC October 18 to 0600 UTC October 19
 Maximum pressure drop in 24 hours – 97 mbarWilma 2005 –  to  – from 1200 UTC October 18 to 1200 UTC October 19

Effects

Costliest Atlantic hurricanes

Deadliest Atlantic hurricanes

Most tornadoes spawned

Miscellaneous records

Worldwide cyclone records set by Atlantic storms
 Costliest tropical cyclone: Hurricane Katrina – 2005 and Hurricane Harvey – 2017 – US$125 billion in damages
 Fastest seafloor current produced by a tropical cyclone: Hurricane Ivan – 2004 – 2.25 m/s (5 mph)
 Highest confirmed wave produced by a tropical cyclone: Hurricane Luis – 1995 –  
 Highest forward speed of a tropical cyclone: Tropical Storm Six – 1961 – 69 mph (111 km/h)
 Most tornadoes spawned by a tropical cyclone: Hurricane Ivan – 2004 – 120 confirmed tornadoes
 Smallest tropical cyclone on record: Tropical Storm Marco – 2008 – gale-force winds extended 11.5 mi (18.5 km) from storm center (previous record: Cyclone Tracy 1974 – 30 mi (48 km))
 Smallest tropical cyclone eye on record: Hurricane Wilma – 2005 – diameter

See also

 List of tropical cyclone records
 List of tropical cyclones
 List of Pacific hurricanes

Notes

References

Records
Meteorology lists